Neighbours From Hell in Britain (sometimes known as NFHiB) was created on 24 October 2002 by two private individuals who experienced repeated forms of neighbour abuse themselves. NFHiB runs as a 'not for profit', voluntary group established to support and help any individual or group who is experiencing a problem relating to 'Neighbours From Hell' (NFH).

About

NFHiB provide information and support with neighbour conflict and are actively involved in advocating for change in the legislation and procedures that currently relate to neighbour conflict.

The site has gathered recognition during the last 5 years, and has featured in the media.

Neighbours From Hell in Britain has also made submissions to the Home Office 'Anti–Social Behaviour, Fifth Report of Session 2004–05' regarding Anti-Social Behaviour.

Neighbours From Hell in Britain is also regularly referred to by UK Government Departments, UK Local Authorities and Police Forces within their official literature.

NFHiB has developed an agenda based on the experience and knowledge of NFHiB Forum members; its motto is 'Support for all, which is free for all'. No mandatory charges are asked for and the site exists via personal funding and voluntary donations from members and visitors.

According to Neighbours From Hell in Britain, the most common forms of neighbour-orientated nuisance stem from issues around Noise, Anti-Social Behaviour, Harassment, Bullying, Boundary Problems and more frequently with Car/Vehicle Parking issues.

May 2006 survey

Over 1000 participants, questioned in an online survey conducted by NFHiB during May 2006, indicated that problems with Noise (21.82%) were the highest source of neighbour disputes, followed by issues around Anti-Social Behaviour (14.30%), Harassment (9.75%) and Boundary Problems / Car Parking Issues both sharing the same 4.27% of survey respondents problems.

NFHiB forum community 

The Neighbours From Hell in Britain online forum community is presented on NFHiB and forms the basis of much information exchange and advice, largely via member-to-member based support.

A large and more general'NFH: What's your story?' area for more complex neighbour from hell situations and issues also exists; and a specific area which covers the laws of Scotland which often differ regarding nuisance neighbour legislation.

The forum is led and moderated by a team of 'Topic Leaders' who are part of the 'NFHiB Support Team' and are the 'official face' of the community.

Interviews 

NFHiB has conducted online interviews and obtained exclusive question and answer sessions with notable individuals. These have included Louise Casey of the Home Office 'Respect Task Force' and Frank Field, MP, during 2004.

References

Internet properties established in 2002
British websites
Political organisations based in the United Kingdom